Robert Marsham, 1st Baron Romney (17 September 1685 – 28 November 1724) of The Mote, Maidstone, known as Sir Robert Marsham, Bt  between 1703 and 1716, was an English Whig politician who sat in the House of Commons from 1708 to 1716 when he was raised to the peerage as Baron Romney.

Early life
Marsham was the son of Sir Robert Marsham, 4th Baronet of Bushey Hall, Hertfordshire, and his wife Margaret Bosvile, daughter of Thomas Bosvile of Little Motte, Eynsford, Kent.  His father was a former MP for Maidstone. Margaret, granddaughter of Sir Francis Wyatt, was heir to the Wyatt family seat and passed Boxley Manor to her son. He matriculated  at St John's College, Oxford on 9 August 1701, aged 15 and succeeded his father in the baronetcy on 26 July 1703.

Career
Marsham  was appointed as J.P. by February 1707. He was returned in a contest as Member of Parliament (MP) for Maidstone at the 1708 British general election. He supported the naturalization of the Palatines in 1709, and voted for the impeachment of Dr Sacheverell in 1710. At the 1710 British general election he was returned again in a contest. He was one of the Members ordered to draft a bill to ascertain the tithe of hops and  presented it on 10 May 1710, but it made no further progress. He continually opposed the Tory Administration throughout the Parliament, voting against an amendment to the South Sea bill on 15 May 1711, and for the "No Peace Without Spain" motion on 7 December 1711. On 18 June 1713 he voted against the French commerce bill. He was returned again for Maidstone at the 1713 British general election. He was a member of the Hanover Club and voted  against the expulsion of Richard Steele on 18 March 1714. When Queen Anne died, he was a signatory to the proclamation of her successor.

Marsham was returned again at the 1715 British general election. After a short while, he was raised to the peerage as Baron Romney, of Romney in the County of Kent, on 22 June 1716 and vacated his seat in the House of Commons to sit in the House of Lords. He was constituted Lieutenant-governor of Dover Castle in 1717. In 1723, he was elected a Fellow of the Royal Society.

Marriage and children
Romney married Elizabeth Shovell, daughter of Admiral of the Fleet Sir Cloudesley Shovell, at the Chapel Royal, Whitehall, on 19 August 1708.  They had two children:

 Hon Elizabeth Marsham (born 15 August 1711, died 25 September 1782).  Married Jacob Bouverie, 1st Viscount Folkestone on 12 April 1741 and had issue.
 Robert Marsham, 2nd Baron Romney (born 22 August 1712, died 16 November 1793).  Married Priscilla, daughter and heiress of Charles Pym.  The couple had at least five children:
Charles Marsham, 1st Earl of Romney (28 September 1744 – 1 March 1811).
Hon. Frances Marsham (b. 2 April 1755).
Hon. Chauvel Marsham (b. 22 October 1757).
Hon. Jacob Marsham (b. 1 March 1759).
Hon. Charlotte Marsham (b. 12 November 1761).

Romney died on 28  November 1724, aged 39, and was buried in Crayford, Kent.  He was succeeded in the barony by his only son, Robert.

Lady Romney married as her second husband John Carmichael, 3rd Earl of Hyndford and died in November 1750, aged 58.

References

1685 births
1724 deaths
Alumni of St John's College, Oxford
Baronets in the Baronetage of England
Barons in the Peerage of Great Britain
Peers of Great Britain created by George I
Members of the Parliament of Great Britain for English constituencies
British MPs 1708–1710
British MPs 1710–1713
British MPs 1713–1715
British MPs 1715–1722
Fellows of the Royal Society